Alan Dinnie (born 14 May 1963) is a Scottish former professional footballer who played as a right back.

Career
Born in Glasgow, Dinnie played for Baillieston, Partick Thistle, Dundee, Albion Rovers and Petershill. Having made the move up into professional football directly from the Junior level aged 23, he was rated highly by his manager at Partick, John Lambie, for his pace and defensive abilities. He credited Jim Duffy with helping him to recover from serious injury while at Dundee.

In his life after playing, he developed an addiction to cocaine and was imprisoned (3.5-year sentence) for supplying the drug, later playing for local Junior team Bankfoot Athletic as part of his reintegration programme at HMP Castle Huntly.

References

1963 births
Living people
Scottish footballers
Partick Thistle F.C. players
Dundee F.C. players
Albion Rovers F.C. players
Petershill F.C. players
Scottish Football League players
Association football fullbacks
Baillieston Juniors F.C. players
Bankfoot Athletic F.C. players
Footballers from Glasgow
Scottish Junior Football Association players
Scottish people convicted of drug offences
21st-century Scottish criminals
Sportspeople convicted of crimes